Livonia is a historical region now divided between Estonia and Latvia.

Livonia may also refer to:

Places

In Europe
 Livonia (Saeima constituency), a constituency of the Saeima in Latvia
 Duchy of Livonia (1561–1621), a territory of the Polish-Lithuanian Commonwealth
 Governorate of Livonia (1721–1918), a territory of the Russian Empire
 Inflanty Voivodeship (Polish Livonia) (1621–1772), a territory of the Polish-Lithuanian Commonwealth
 Kingdom of Livonia (1570–1578), a fief of Russia
 Swedish Livonia (1629–1721), a dominion of the Swedish Empire
 Terra Mariana (1207–1561), official name of medieval Livonia
 United Baltic Duchy or Grand Duchy of Livonia, a 1918 proposed state
 Livonia electoral district (Russian Constituent Assembly election, 1917)

In the United States
Livonia, Indiana
Livonia, Louisiana, a town
Livonia, Michigan
Livonia, Missouri, a village
Livonia (town), New York 
Livonia (village), New York
Livonia, Pennsylvania
Livonia Avenue (BMT Canarsie Line), a street and subway stop in Brooklyn, New York
Livonia Township, Sherburne County, Minnesota

Antarctica
Livonia Rock

Other uses
Livonia (album), a 1990 album by His Name Is Alive
Livonia (gastropod), a genus of marine snails
Livonia Cup, a football trophy contested annually between Estonian and Latvian domestic league champions
Air Livonia, a small airline based in Estonia

See also
Lavonia, Georgia, United States